Krishna Bharadwaj (born 18 July 1989) is an Indian television actor. He was born in Ranchi, Jharkhand. He has played roles in shows like Jasuben Jayantilaal Joshi Ki Joint Family, Sukh By Chance, R. K. Laxman Ki Duniya, Piya Basanti Re and 
Tenali Rama among others. He also acted in a few short films, such as "I Guess" (2013).

Bharadwaj last  played the title role in a TV Series Tenali Rama for SAB TV whose last episode was aired on 13 Nov 2020, The series was based on a 16th-century court poet in the Vijayanagara Empire of medieval India, who is remembered for his extraordinary wit. Bharadwaj shaved his head for this role. He has also enacted the lead role in a Gujarati movie, Chal Man Jeetva Jaiye.

Filmography

Television advertisement
2007:Scooty Pink  launch commercial  along with prominent Bollywood celebrity, Preity Zinta

References

Indian male television actors
Living people
1989 births
People from Ranchi
Male actors from Jharkhand